The Quay School of the Arts is a Tertiary Art School in Whanganui, a west coast city in the North Island of New Zealand. It was part of the Wanganui Polytechnic but now is an adjunct of Whanganui UCOL (Universal College of Learning).

References

External links

Art schools in New Zealand
Schools in Whanganui